South Carolina Highway 332 (SC 332) is a  state highway in the U.S. state of South Carolina. The highway travels through mostly rural areas of Orangeburg County.

Route description
SC 322 begins at an intersection with SC 4 (Neeses Highway) east of Springfield, within Orangeburg County. It travels to the south and immediately curves to the southeast. It crosses over Rocky Swamp Creek. It curves to the east-northeast and passes Hunter–Kinard–Tyler School. SC 322 curves to the southeast and to the east-southeast just before entering the city limits of Norway. It crosses over Willow Swamp and some railroad tracks before it intersects U.S. Route 321 (US 321; Savannah Highway) and the western terminus of SC 400 (Norway Road). US 321 and SC 322 travel concurrently to the southern part of the town, with SC 322 traveling to the east-southeast on Cope Road. It travels in a roughly southeastern direction to an intersection with SC 70 (Binnicker Bridge Road). Almost immediately, the highway crosses over Roberts Swamp. Just before entering Cope, it crosses over Sam Branch and some railroad tracks and curves to the northeast. In town, at the intersection with Slab Landing Road, the highway turns right to the south-southeast. It curves to the southeast just before meeting its eastern terminus, an intersection with US 301/US 601 (Bamberg Highway).

Major intersections

See also

References

External links

SC 332 South Carolina Hwy Index

332
Transportation in Orangeburg County, South Carolina